The SS Ryndam was an ocean liner built for the Nederlandsch-Amerikaansche Stoomvaart-Maatschappij, more widely know in English as the Holland America Line in 1951.  She was built by N.V. Dok en Werfmaatschappij Wilton-Fijenoord, Schiedam. She was christened by Mrs. C. Tjarda van Stakenborgh Stachouwer-Marburg (wife of the prewar Governor-General of the Dutch East Indies). The original intent of her design was to be designated as the freighter Dinteldyk (which was also designed to carry a small complement of passengers). A decision was made to have her redesigned as a liner in 1950, but she still retained the stout hull lines and sturdy machinery of a freighter. The ship played a major role in post-war immigration from Europe making frequent voyages to New York City and the Pier 21 immigration facility in Halifax, Nova Scotia, Canada. In March 1962 Edward & Alex Van Halen, and their parents Jan & Eugenia Van Halen, immigrated to the US aboard the SS Ryndam.

In 1973, she was sold to a Panamanian subsidiary of a Greek shipping interest and extensively refitted with her bow line changed, many internal changes, and alterations to her superstructure. This was done to give her a more modern (at the time) 1970s design appearance. In 1988 she was sold to gaming interests and performed short cruises in the Gulf of Mexico under the name Pride of Mississippi, and in 1991 was renamed Pride of Galveston.  In 1993, she was docked permanently in Gulfport, Mississippi and became the Copa Casino.  When Copa Casino adopted a more permanent structure, a decision was made that she should be scrapped. She foundered off the coast of the Dominican Republic on her way to the ship breakers in Alang, India on 16 March 2003.

References

Ships of the Holland America Line
Ships built in Schiedam
1950 ships